Gava is a surname. People with the surname include:

 Gava of Tidore (died c. 1560), Moluccan ruler
 Antonio Gava (1930–2008), Italian politician and member of Christian Democracy 
 Cassandra Gava (born 1959), American actress and producer
 Fabio Gava (born 1949), Italian politician 
 Franck Gava (born 1970), former French attacking midfielder football player
 Manuel Gava (born 1991), Italian-born German politician
 Orgest Gava (born 1990), Albanian professional footballer
 Rafael Gava (born 1993), Brazilian midfielder football player
 Silvio Gava (1901–1999), Italian politician
 Todd Gava (born 1981), Australian footballer
 Vannia Gava (born 1974), Italian politician
 Vitor Gava Anselmo (born 1991), Brazilian football defender

See also
 Gava (disambiguation)

Italian-language surnames